The 1998 Czech Figure Skating Championships were held in Brno between December 18 and 21, 1997. Skaters competed in the disciplines of men's singles, ladies' singles, pair skating, and ice dancing on the senior and junior levels.

Senior results

Men

Ladies

Pairs

Ice dancing

External links
 results

1997 in figure skating
Czech Figure Skating Championships, 1998
Czech Figure Skating Championships
1998 in Czech sport